The George Nesmith Bridge carries U.S. Route 98 (US 98) over the St. Marks River in Newport, Florida.

See also

References

External links
FDOT Florida Bridge Data 01-05-2010
Wakulla Area Times, Volume 8 Edition 4 (April 2010), p. 40

Transportation buildings and structures in Wakulla County, Florida
Road bridges in Florida
U.S. Route 98
Bridges of the United States Numbered Highway System
2001 establishments in Florida
Bridges completed in 2001